Morvi Railway (MR) was a  line in the princely state of Morvi in Gujarat, India.

History
The Morvi Railway was built by the Morvi State. Construction started in 1886 and the line was opened to traffic in 1890 between Wadhwan and Wankaner as a  narrow gauge roadside tramway. During 1905 the metre gauge lines were extended to 73 miles and the  lines were now 17 miles. The gauge conversion to metre gauge from Wankaner to Morvi was completed in 1924 under the regime of Lakhdiraji Thakor. 

In April 1948 it was merged into Saurashtra Railway.

Rolling stock 
In 1936, the company owned 59 locomotives, 3 railcars, 134 coaches and 315 goods wagons.

Classification
It was labeled as a Class II railway according to Indian Railway Classification System of 1926.

Conversion to broad gauge
The railway was converted to Broad gauge in the year 2001.

References

2 ft 6 in gauge railways in India
Metre gauge railways in India
Defunct railway companies of India
History of rail transport in Gujarat
Morbi district